The Spanish motorway (highway) network is the third largest in the world, by length. There are two main types of such roads, autopistas and autovías, which differed in the strictness of the standards they are held up to.

History
Between 1990 and 2012 Spain had one of the highest rates of motorway growth in Europe.

The first motorways named autopista were financed using sovereign debt.

At the end of the 1980s, and before Olympic Games in 1992 in Barcelona, the autonomous Catalan government was interested in increasing the speed limit on new motorways. Between 1987 and 1990, the operations at four new motorways were transferred to private companies, three by the Catalan region and one by the national government.

Building of new sections of  autovia was increased before the 1992 Olympic Games and the Sevilla World Fair.

The 1984-1992 National Plan built around 3500 kilometers of new autovia, to reach a network length of 6000 kilometres by 1992, at a cost of 184 million pesetas ( around 1 million euros). 
At the same time, the new autovia standard was closer to the autopista standard, as the old autovia standard was understood as not providing enough safety. This generated increasing project costs.

Since traffic density is generally lower in Spain than France, it was required that some motorways were to be untolled. Despite a lower traffic density, Spanish motorways remain profitable, because tolls are twice higher in Spain than in France.

Between 2005 and 2014, Spain was the EU country which best performed for decreasing fatalities on motorways, with a decrease score of 66%.

Differences between autopista and autovía 
The distinction between two kinds of high capacity roads is mainly a historical one, seldom with practical consequences for most but the oldest motorways. Both kinds are divided highways with full access control and at least two lanes per direction. Specific limits may be imposed based on road, meteorologic or traffic conditions.

Autopistas are specifically reserved for automobile travel, so all vehicles not able to sustain at least  are banned from them. Thus, they may not be an upgrade to an older road, since the Spanish legislation requires an alternative route to be provided for such vehicles. Many, but not all, autopistas are toll roads, which also mandates an alternative toll-free route (though not necessarily a freeway) under the Spanish laws. An example is the AP-2 toll autopista, which links Zaragoza with Barcelona through the Monegros desert. In this case, the alternative is the N-II, the national road that preceded the A-2 autovía.

On the other hand, autovías are usually (though not always) upgrades from older roads, and always untolled. In general, slow vehicles like bicycles and agricultural machinery are allowed under certain restrictions so as to not disrupt the traffic excessively or cause any danger. Furthermore, an autovía will most likely follow the original road very closely, only deviating from it to bypass the towns (which are looped around in variantes). Thus, the upgraded road usually serves as the base for one of the two directions of the new autovía, which means the turns can be steeper than in autopistas. All in all, an autovía:
 Allows traffic banned from an autopista, like bicycles. However, if the autovía is built as a new road instead of an upgrade to an older one, this traffic may be banned too.
 May have little to no hard shoulders, which are then marked with a solid line instead of the broken line of a transitable hard shoulder.
 May have acceleration and deceleration lanes that are much shorter than those of autopistas.
 May have tighter turns and steeper gradients than an autopista is allowed to.
 If space-constrained, it may even have bus stops on a service lane in the autovía itself, as opposed to requiring them to be placed on a service lane physically separated from the main road.
 Also if extremely space-constrained, there can be acceleration and deceleration lanes merging on the left lane of the autovía.
However, most of the situations listed here only apply to the oldest autovías, and mainly to the radial A-1 through A-6 plus the A-42 near their endpoints, which were the first to be twinned in the 60s into dual carriageways (with at-level intersections) and then were upgraded to limited-access freeways in the 70s-80s, keeping most of their old route unchanged except where the old national road ventured into towns. In those cases, the freeway would make a semi-loop called a variante around the town, leaving the old national road as the access between the freeway and the town.
New autovías usually have perfectly normal acceleration and deceleration lanes, very safe turns and transitable shoulders. Thus, the practical difference between a "new" autovía and a generic autopista is mainly the frequency of exits, which is usually higher in an autovía - upgraded from an old road with many crosses - than in a new, purpose-designed autopista with fewer preconditions imposed on it.

Safety

It is considered that the construction of motorways has helped to increase safety in Spanish roads, while generating a traffic increase.

Fatalities on motorways have decreased from 776 in 2006 to 277 in 2015.

Spain is one of the countries of the EU with most of road fatalities occurring on motorways rather than other roads: 16% in 2015. But the same year, taking into account the fact that Spain counts a longer distance of road as motorways, Spain is one of the countries with the less motorway fatality rates per 1.000 km of motorways, after Finland, Denmark, Croatia, and Hungary: 18.1 fatalities per 1000 kilometers of motorways.

Effective speed

Source: https://www.mitma.gob.es/recursos_mfom/comodin/recursos/vel_autovia_mes.pdf

State-managed motorways 
Most of the high capacity roads in Spain are under the authority of the General Roads Directorate of the Ministry of Public Works, a department of the central Government of Spain, with the exceptions of Navarre and the Basque Country, the only autonomous communities which have been transferred full powers over all roads in their territories. Usually, the DGC manages all road maintenance, but in the case of the tolled autopistas, the management is commonly delegated to the concessionaire company.

Traditionally, purpose-built autopistas or autovías were assigned names starting with A plus one or two numbers describing their general orientation, while upgraded autovías kept their original names. Thus, the freeway that is currently known as A-5 was still reported as N-V in road signs for years after the upgrade was completed, making it difficult for drivers to know in advance which roads had become autovías. However, in 2003 all Spanish motorways were uniformly renamed with the following criteria:
 Interurban free-to-use motorways are named "A-" plus:
 one number, if it is one of the major axes of Spain, being A-1 to A-6 the six radial highways stemming from Madrid, A-7 the highway through the Mediterranean coast, and A-8 the highway through the Cantabrian (northern) coast. Number 9 is reserved for the highway through the Atlantic coast of Galicia, but it is a toll road, so it is named AP-9 (see below).
 two numbers, elsewhere.
 Beltways are named with a one or two letter code identifying the city they orbit, plus two digits indicative of the general distance. For example, the M-50 is further from the city of Madrid than the M-40.
 City access motorways are named similarly to beltways, like TO-21 for a freeway leaving the A-40 towards Toledo.
 Tolled motorways add a "P" (thus, "AP-") before the dash, and must be clearly identified as such in road signs. For example, AP-9.
 An exception to this naming rule are the radial toll motorways starting in Madrid, R-2 through R-5
All such names are posted in white letters on blue background, like:  A-49  or  AP-4 . Note that none of these naming and coloring requisites affect roads under the authority of the Autonomous Communities. For example, the A-8 road in the Basque Country is a tolled autopista, as are the C-16,  C-32 and C-33 in Catalonia. Other communities such as Madrid do follow the convention, and have names as MP-203 for a tolled road and M-501 for a free autovía. Furthermore, roads under the authority of the Andalusian government also start with A, but they have longer numeric codes and different coloring.

Interurban motorways 

The roads listed below form the backbone of the Spanish high capacity network, connecting all provincial capitals and other major towns and destinations. Until recently, the network suffered from a high radiality, which collapsed the several Madrid beltways and the roads into the city and region. Since the 2000s, an effort to improve the situation was made based on two actions:
 Build a new set of radial autopistas (named R-n instead of A-n) complementary to the old radial autovías near Madrid. Such tolled autopistas would form a new system of accesses to the capital that merges with their autovía counterparts far from Madrid. The main advantage to these roads is that they allow true fast travel from the first kilometre, while the radial autovías near Madrid (among the oldest autovía stretches in Spain) frequently go through populations, have constant entries and exits and suffer several other conditions which both jam them and make their first kilometres limited to speeds well under the normal  limit.
 Invest heavily in de-radialization efforts that create true cross-country high-capacity axes without passing through Madrid. For example, the A-66 (Autovía Ruta de la Plata) which connects the southern Andalusia with the northwest area of the country, or the A-43 which will connect the western Extremadura region with the east of Spain.

Beltways, city accesses and urban highways 

Most beltways, full or partial, have originated from the upgrading of one or several roads reaching the town to the autovía level, as the several variantes looping around the town were joined in a single beltway that received a new naming such as TO-20 or Z-40.  The list below only contains roads that are recognized as autovías or autopistas for at least part of its length, thus disqualifying urban arteries with at-grade intersections or unrestricted direct access to the main lanes, which are better represented by the dual carriageway concept.

*: under construction

Regional-managed motorways
The formation of the several Autonomous Communities in the early 1980s led to the transfer of many roads to the new regional authorities. Since then, several of those roads have been upgraded to motorway level in order to ensure the internal vertebration of the region, or to provide alternative high-capacity routes to those managed by the national government when those were inadequate or saturated. All of the old comarcal roads (C-nnn) comprising the secondary network were transferred to the Autonomous Communities, splitting them up as necessary; while the national roads (N-nnn) that formed the primary network were mostly kept by the State.

The level of control each community has over its road network varies: the Basque Country and Navarre have received the titularity of nearly all roads in their territories, while in other communities the regional network coexists with and complements the national one. Whatever the extension of the road network under its control, all communities have full powers over naming and identification of their roads, provided no name conflicts with a national road or a regional road of a neighbouring community.

Andalusia

The regional highway network of Andalusia is very extensive, as the territory itself spans nearly a fifth of Spain. There are no special codes for identifying highways: upgraded roads usually keep their name and sign color (orange, green or yellow). However, confusion sometimes arises due to the fact that most regional roads start with the letter A (for Andalucía), which is also used by the national government for highways.

*: planned/in construction

Aragon
The community of Aragon has only very recently started building its own highway network. The first span was opened to traffic just in 2008, and there are at least three more highways in study. Due to the limited financial capabilities of the Aragon regional government, many of them might be built as toll roads.

*: in construction — †: planned

Asturias

The highway network in the mountainous Principality of Asturias is severely limited by the complexity of its relief, with a dense network of river valleys in between ranges such as the Picos de Europa.

Vertebral Asturian motorways have identifiers in the style of national ones, that is, white text on blue background, while roads in process of upgrading keep their old nomenclature until the full route is completed. Such is the case, for example, with the AS-III, which is an upgrade of the AS-17. The prefix is always AS, and Roman numerals are used.

*: planned/in construction

Balearic Islands

All of the roads in the Balearic Islands were transferred to the regional government when the Autonomous Community was formed, and several are now under the competence of the several Island Councils (Consell Insular). The prefix denotes the island, and the second letter (if any) is lowercase. Autopista identifiers are white on blue background, while twinned roads closer to the autovía category keep their identifiers.

Basque Country
A special case together with Navarre, the Basque Country has received full powers over most roads in its territory, including the national roads that comprised the primary network, and nowadays only the AP-1 and the AP-68 are under the direct authority of the Spanish government as part of the Red de carreteras del Estado (National Road Network). Currently, roads are managed by the three Diputaciones Forales of the Basque provinces.

The fact that such transfer took place before the thorough renaming of national roads and highways in 2003 makes the naming of transferred "national" highways inconsistent with the national network: the A-1 is still called the N-I in the Basque Country, and the same identifier (A-8) applies to the tolled and toll-free parts of the Autopista del Cantábrico in Biscay. Furthermore, new highways built since then by the provinces have one of the following prefixes: A for Álava-Araba, BI for Biscay (Vizcaya-Bizkaia) or GI for Guipúzcoa-Gipuzkoa.

*: in construction — †: planned

Canary Islands

Following the example of the other insular community in Spain, all roads in the Canary Islands are under the authority of either the regional government or one of the several Island Councils (cabildo insular).  The prefix denotes the island, and identifiers are usually white on blue background.

Castile-La Mancha

Another community that has recently started building its own high capacity road network, Castile-La Mancha has completed one autovía and has at least five more in varied states of advanced planning and building. In the flat La Mancha, relief does not usually require costly tunnels and bridges, though the region does contain several nature reserves including the Tablas de Daimiel National Park wetlands. Highway identifiers are white on blue background.

*: in construction — †: planned

Castile and León

The largest community in Spain by land area, Castile and León has a dense road network, but until recently most of its highways had been part of the national system. The terrain is varied, from the plains of the Meseta to the rugosities of the Montes de León, and archeological remains abound. Regional highways are renamed to A-nnn, always with three digits to avoid clashes with the national network, but usually keeping the original number of the upgraded regional road CL-nnn. Identifiers are white on blue background.

*: in construction — †: planned

Cantabria
The only community without a high-capacity network of its own, Cantabria is severely held back in such a development by a highly mountainous terrain that multiplies the cost of building any kind of expressway. Thus, its population is served by the national highway network supplemented by regional conventional roads.

Catalonia
The second most populated community in Spain, Catalonia has a thorough regional road network, with several highways managed by the Generalitat de Catalunya. Also, the state-owned highways previously known as A-16 through A-19 were transferred to the Catalan government and renamed according to the new regional guidelines enacted in 2004. Highway identifiers are white on blue background.

*: in construction — †: planned

Extremadura
A sparsely populated community, Extremadura has a terrain that can be considered favourable for a regional highway plan, as the interior is mostly flat.

Nevertheless, the community is in an excellent position for connections between Spain and Portugal (the national highway A-5 reaches Portugal through Badajoz in Extremadura), and in the last decade, the regional government has revealed an ambitious plan that would create four to six regional highways. In addition to the vertebration of the Extremaduran territory, some of these roads are explicitly meant to provide alternative routes to the two national highways in the region (A-5 and A-66), establishing connections between them and an additional route to Portugal to the north of the current one.

It is the policy of the regional government to avoid twinning existing roads (and thus replacing them with the upgraded autovía), so instead all autovías are built from scratch even if they are parallel to the old road. All Extremaduran highways are currently named EX-An, with white identifiers on blue background. Some of them have branches named EX-An-Rm, which also have white-on-blue identifiers, but such branches need not be highways themselves even if they are built concurrently with the main road.

*: in construction — †: planned

Galicia
Often compared to Scotland because of its orographic similarities, Galicia is a hilly but not mountainous region with an approximate population of 3M people. Its highway network mainly functions as the terminal part of trips, since the vertebral function is mainly coped by the national system. Identifiers start with AG (for Autovía/Autoestrada galega) and are white on blue background.

*: in construction — †: planned

La Rioja
The small and mountainous region of La Rioja has just started planning regional highways of its own. After an initial plan to upgrade the LR-134 road (Calahorra—Arnedo) was downgraded to a simple twinning with roundabout intersections, a study is now being drawn to build at least a true highway connecting the national highways AP-68 and A-12, with a possible projection into the south of the community. Another highway would provide access from the regional capital beltway to the tolled AP-68.

*: in construction — †: planned

Madrid
The region containing the capital city of Spain, Madrid ranks the 3rd community by population, and is by far the most densely populated. Even though it contains the centre of the national radial highway system, the Madrid regional government (traditionally more committed to the expansion of the Metro system) has dedicated vast resources during the last decade to upgrade the regional road network and, where necessary, create new high-capacity roads that both complement the national system and vertebrate zones of the community not covered by the national network.

Madrid regional highways have codes that are no different from other regional roads, with orange, green and yellow backgrounds, even for newly built highways like the M-45. Usually, the upgrade of long roads, twinned or not, to the motorway level is not undertaken at once, so the list below only contains the itinerary for the spans that actually run as highways or have been planned to. For example, the M-506 is "broken" at its connection with the M-419 and the A-42 by a succession of roundabouts until the link with the R-4, so in the list it is separated in two highway stretches.

*: in construction — †: planned

Murcia
The coastal region of Murcia is an important touristic destination in Spain. Its nearly 1.5 million inhabitants are mainly concentrated in the eastern part of the community, from Murcia city to the coast, while inland zones of Yecla, Jumilla and Caravaca de la Cruz are more sparsely populated. The national highway network provides good connectivity along the coast, with three highways links with Andalusia (A-91, A-7 and the tolled AP-7) and another three with the Valencian Community (A-7 and the tolled AP-7 and AP-37), but only the A-30 motorway connects Murcia with inland Spain. It is thus the goal of the regional government to provide alternative highway corridors that connect the inland border of Murcia to the coastal zones.

All in all, the autonomous government is investing heavily in its highway network, both for trips along the coast and inland-coast connectivity. Due to the expansion of the regional network that this effort is expected to produce, Murcia has recently implemented a new naming scheme for its regional highways, more in accordance with the national network. When the renaming is complete, all highways will be identified by white-on-blue names that start with RM (for Región de Murcia).

*: in construction — †: planned

Navarre
The Foral Community of Navarre is another community with full powers over most roads in its territory. However, in contrast to the neighbouring Basque Country, the regional government has decided to keep the identifiers of some highways — namely, those which were part of a national highway before being transferred — in sync with the national system. The only road in Navarrese territory not under the authority of the regional government is the national toll highway AP-68 (Autopista Vasco-Aragonesa), which was kept by the state to avoid a four-pronged management by the concessionaire and the Basque, Navarrese and Spanish governments.

*: in construction — †: planned

Valencian Community
The regional motorways do not have identifiers different from other roads, so orange, green and yellow backgrounds are possible. All identifiers are prefixed with CV for Comunitat Valenciana, the official name of the region. The regional highway CV-10 is currently being expanded to the boundary with Catalonia and will be transferred to the national Government as a new stretch of the A-7 (Autovía del Mediterráneo). The same applies to the CV-40 highway.

*: in construction — †: planned

See also
Transport in Spain
List of controlled-access highway systems
Evolution of motorway construction in European nations

References

 
Highways